This partial list of city nicknames in Maine compiles the aliases, sobriquets and slogans that cities in Maine are known by. City nicknames can help in establishing a civic identity, helping outsiders recognize a community or attracting people to a community because of its nickname; promote civic pride; and build community unity. Nicknames and slogans that successfully create a new community "ideology or myth" are also believed to have economic value. Their economic value is difficult to measure, but there are anecdotal reports of cities that have achieved substantial economic benefits by "branding" themselves by adopting new slogans.
Bangor – The Queen City of the East
Bath – The City of Ships
Cherryfield – Blueberry Capital of the World
Farmington 
Earmuff Capital of the World
Farm Town
Freeport – Birthplace of Maine
Lincoln – The Gateway Town
Lewiston – Little Canada
The Dirty Lew
Millinocket – The Magic City
Portland – Forest City (reported in 1894)
Presque Isle – The Star City
Rockland – Lobster Capital of the World
Strong – Toothpick Capital of the World
Waterville
 The Elm City
 The University City of Maine

See also
 List of city nicknames in the United States

References

Maine cities and towns
Populated places in Maine
City nicknames